Wanadurga (Wandurg, Vanadurga) is a village in Shahapur taluka of Yadgir district in Karnataka state, India. Wanadurga is twelve kilometres by road west of Sagar, and four kilometres south-southwest of Hoskera. The nearest railhead is in Yadgir.

Demographics 
At the 2001 census, Wanadurga had 4,038 inhabitants, with 2,061 males and 1,977 females. By the 2011 census it had grown to 4.849 people, with 2,462 males and 2,387 females.

Notes

External links 
 

Villages in Yadgir district